
Gmina Tomice is a rural gmina (administrative district) in Wadowice County, Lesser Poland Voivodeship, in southern Poland.

Villages
Gmina Tomice contains the villages and settlements of Lgota, Radocza, Tomice, Witanowice, Woźniki and Zygodowice.

Neighbouring gminas
Gmina Tomice is bordered by the gminas of Brzeźnica, Spytkowice, Wadowice, Wieprz and Zator.

References
Polish official population figures 2006

Tomice
Wadowice County